The Thuri, also known as Shatt,  and Luo people of South Sudan. They speak DheThuri, a Luo language that is similar to the Jur and Dinka languages. Having been perceived as close to the Dinka people, the Thuri were targets of ethnic violence during the Second Sudanese Civil War, when the "Army of Peace", a mostly Fertit pro-government militia, attacked them as supporters of the mostly Dinka SPLA rebels. This caused many Thuri to take up arms and to join the SPLA in order to take revenge against other Fertit groups.

References

Bibliography 

Ethnic groups in South Sudan